The 2014 Asian Youth Girls Volleyball Championship was a volleyball competition held in the MCC Hall Convention Center The Mall Nakhon Ratchasima Shopping Mall, Thailand from 11–19 October 2014. The game was part of the Asian Youth Volleyball Championship.

Pools composition

The teams were seeded based on their final ranking at the 2012 Asian Youth Girls Volleyball Championship.
2014 Asian Youth Girls Volleyball Championship Squads List

* Withdraw

Preliminary round

Pool A

|}

|}

Pool B

|}

|}

Pool C

|}

|}

Pool D

|}

|}

Classification round
 The results and the points of the matches between the same teams that were already played during the preliminary round shall be taken into account for the classification round.

Pool E

|}

|}

Pool F

|}

|}

Pool G

|}

|}

Pool H

|}

|}

11th place

|}
Vietnam defeated India in straight sets 25-15 25-18 26-24 in the 11th-12th playoff. However, Vietnam still violated the AVC rules and regulations by fielding three players who had competed in the previous edition in Chengdu, China two years earlier. Following the Control Committee’s decision, Vietnam lost this match with a 0–25 0–25 0–25 scoreline and finished in 12th position.

9th place

|}

Final round

Quarterfinals

|}

5th–8th semifinals

|}

Semifinals

|}

7th place

|}

5th place

|}

3rd place

|}

Final

|}

Final standing

Team Roster
Marina Takahashi, Shiori Aratani, Airi Miyabe, Manami Mandai, Kanoha Kagamihara, Miharu Yoshioka, Rin Takahashi, Haruka Sekiyama, Shuri Yamaguchi, Miku Shimada, Yaka Yamaguchi, Miyu Nakagawa
Head Coach: Daichi Saegusa

Awards

Most Valuable Player
  Airi Miyabe
Best Outside Hitters
  Li Yingying
  Chatchu-on Moksri
Best Setter
  Natthanicha Jaisaen

Best Middle Blockers
  Miyu Nakagawa
Best Libero
  Kanoha Kagamihara
Best Opposite
  Pimpichaya Kokram

References

External links
 Asian Volleyball Confederation

Asian women's volleyball championships
Asian Cup
V
V
Asian Girls' U17 Volleyball Championship